Jabulane Michael Radebe is a South African politician who represented the African National Congress (ANC) in the Free State Provincial Legislature from 2019 until 2023. He was first elected to the provincial legislature in the 2019 general election, ranked seventh on the ANC's provincial party list. 

He resigned from the legislature in 2023.

References

External links 
 

Living people
Year of birth missing (living people)
Members of the Free State Provincial Legislature
African National Congress politicians
21st-century South African politicians